Petko Voyvoda Peak is a partly ice-covered peak of elevation 400 m in Delchev Ridge in Tangra Mountains, Livingston Island in the South Shetland Islands, Antarctica, which surmounts Sopot Ice Piedmont to the northwest, and Pautalia Glacier to the east.

The peak is named after Captain Petko Voyvoda (pseudonym of Petko Kiryakov, 1844–1900), leader of the Bulgarian liberation movement in Western Thrace and the Rhodope Mountains.

Location

Maps
 L.L. Ivanov et al. Antarctica: Livingston Island and Greenwich Island, South Shetland Islands. Scale 1:100000 topographic map. Sofia: Antarctic Place-names Commission of Bulgaria, 2005.
 L.L. Ivanov. Antarctica: Livingston Island and Greenwich, Robert, Snow and Smith Islands. Scale 1:120000 topographic map.  Troyan: Manfred Wörner Foundation, 2009.

References
Petko Voyvoda Peak. SCAR Composite Antarctic Gazetteer
 Bulgarian Antarctic Gazetteer. Antarctic Place-names Commission. (details in Bulgarian, basic data in English)

External links
 Petko Voyvoda Peak. Copernix satellite image

Tangra Mountains